Daniel Adam Cortes (born March 4, 1987) is an American former professional baseball pitcher. He was drafted by the Chicago White Sox in the seventh round of the 2005 Major League Baseball Draft. He also played in the Kansas City Royals organization.

Professional career

Chicago White Sox
While playing under manager Jerry Hairston, Cortes went 1–4 with a 5.17 ERA and 38 strikeouts in 15 games, even started. Baseball America ranked Cortes as the 22nd best prospect in the White Sox organization.

In  Cortes began his season with the Class-A Kannapolis Intimidators of the South Atlantic League. He went 3–9 with a 4.01 ERA and 96 strikeouts in 20 games, 19 starts. He was then traded to the Kansas City Royals along with pitcher Tyler Lumsden in exchange for pitcher Mike MacDougal on July 24.

Kansas City Royals
Cortes finished the 2006 season with the Class-A Burlington Bees of the Midwest League. He went 1–2 with a 6.69 ERA with 30 strikeouts in seven games, all starts.

In  Cortes played for the Class-A Advanced Wilmington Blue Rocks of the Carolina League. He went 8–8 with a 3.07 ERA with 120 strikeouts in 23 games, all starts. He was named the Carolina League Pitcher of the Week for the week of August 20 to August 26. Cortes was again awarded Pitcher of the Week for the week of August 27 to September 2.

Cortes went 10–4 with a 3.78 ERA with 109 strikeouts in 23 games, all starts. Before the season he was ranked as the second best prospect in the Royals' organization by Baseball America. He was also named to the Texas League All-Star team. He did miss playing time while on the disabled list. The Royals recognized Cortes as the top pitcher for the Double-A Naturals and he was selected to play in the Arizona Fall League at the end of the '08 season.

In January,  Cortes received the "Paul Splittorff Pitcher of the Year Award" from the Royals. He attended spring training with the Royals in '09 as a non-roster invitee. Cortes was named a "Player to Watch" by MLB.com before the season. He went 6–6 with a 3.92 ERA with 57 strikeouts in 16 games, 15 starts with the Double-A Northwest Arkansas Naturals. On July 10 he was traded by the Royals with Derrick Saito to the Seattle Mariners in exchange for Yuniesky Betancourt.

Seattle Mariners
After the trade Cortes was assigned to the Double-A West Tenn Diamond Jaxx. Cortes went 1–5 with a 4.94 ERA and 55 strikeouts in 10 games, all starts. He was added to the Mariners 40-man roster on November 20.

On December 12, 2011, the Mariners announced via their Twitter feed that Cortes had been non-tendered along with catcher Chris Gimenez.

Washington Nationals
Cortes signed a minor league contract with the Washington Nationals on January 4, 2012. His contract was voided on February 29, after he failed his physical with the Nationals.

Arizona Diamondbacks
Cortes signed a minor league contract with the Arizona Diamondbacks on March 15, 2013.

Personal life
Cortes, who had taken a summer job at a sporting goods store, was taken bowling by his new co-workers and when he attempted to leave the bowling alley he was stabbed after trying to break up a confrontation between his co-worker and the stabber. His co-worker died and Cortes was hospitalized. He questioned if he would be able to pitch again since the injury was on his throwing arm. He did however make a full recovery.

On January 1, 2009, Cortes was arrested on charges of public intoxication and disorderly conduct in Fayetteville, Arkansas. According to police accounts, Cortes was arrested after he allegedly urinated on a fence outside Grub's Bar & Grille. After five hours in jail, Cortes was released when he posted a $655 bond.

References

External links

1987 births
Living people
Águilas de Mexicali players
Baseball players from California
Bristol White Sox players
Burlington Bees players
Cardenales de Lara players
American expatriate baseball players in Venezuela
Kannapolis Intimidators players
Lake Elsinore Storm players
Major League Baseball pitchers
Mobile BayBears players
Northwest Arkansas Naturals players
Seattle Mariners players
Sportspeople from Pomona, California
Surprise Rafters players
Tacoma Rainiers players
Tiburones de La Guaira players
Tucson Padres players
West Tennessee Diamond Jaxx players
Wilmington Blue Rocks players
York Revolution players